Kekla Magoon is an American author, best known for her NAACP Image Award-nominated young adult novel The Rock and the River, How It Went Down, The Season of Styx Malone, and X. In 2021, she received the Margaret Edwards Award from the American Library Association for her body of work. Her works also include middle grade novels, short stories, and historical, socio-political, and economy-related non-fiction.

Personal life 
Magoon was born in Michigan and grew up in Fort Wayne, Indiana. She is the biracial daughter of a white American mother with Dutch and Scottish ancestry and a black Cameroonian father. As a child, she spent a few years living in Cameroon.

Prior to becoming a writer, she worked for non-profit organizations in New York City. She graduated with a bachelor's degree from Northwestern University, where she majored in History, with a concentration on Africa and the Middle East. Magoon has a master of fine arts degree in Writing from Vermont College of Fine Arts, which she was able to study via a low-residency program for children's writers. In 2015, she taught writing in New York City and served as a judge for School Library Journal. In 2017, she was faculty at the Highlights Foundation, a non-profit organization in Honesdale, Pennsylvania, where she taught a workshop about developing new creative strategies through meditation sessions, workshop elements, and discussion, together with authors Laurie Calkhoven and Nicole Valentine.

She is a member of the NWP Writers Council.

Magoon lives in Vermont and teaches writing at the Vermont College of Fine Arts.

Selected works 
Magoon says that all her novels deal with how ordinary kids can make a difference in the world.

Her debut novel, The Rock and the River, set in 1968 Chicago and follows the story of the 13-year-old son of a civil rights activist and follower of Martin Luther King Jr., who has to deal with his brother joining the Black Panther Party. It discusses issues of class, race, and poverty. Magoon says she spent time deliberately researching the non-violent civil rights movement, has always had an interest in history, and majored in History in college. She initially had the idea to write the novel between her first semester at Northwestern University and revised the first draft during her second and third semester, before submitting The Rock and the River as her thesis.

She wrote her fourth young adult novel, How It Went Down, about the aftermath of the shooting of a black teenager, in response to the shooting of Trayvon Martin and Michael Brown. Frustrated by the media coverage's bias, she decided to write a fictionalized story that explored what it would be like to be personally affected through a close family member or friend being killed.

Magoon's sixth young adult novel X is a fictionalized account of civil rights activist Malcolm X's formative years and co-authored with his daughter, Ilyasah Shabazz. Shabazz says her agent chose Magoon as a co-writer based on the quality of her previous work and the themes she tackled in her novels.

Her seventh Middle Grade novel, The Season of Styx Malone, about three African American boys living in a small town in Indiana, United States, who swap their little sister for fireworks, was published by Wendy Lamb books in 2018. Magoon says that she loosely based the novel on a real event from her childhood, when an ice cream parlor clerk in North Carolina told them about how his father and uncle once tried to trade their baby sister.

In July 2019 it was announced that Magoon would be publishing a non-fiction young adult novel about the legacy of the Black Panthers, called Until All Are Free: The Black Panther Party's Call for Revolution and slated for a tentative publication date with Candlewick in 2021.

Critical reception 
Magoon's novels have earned starred reviews from multiple literary magazines.

Her novels Light It Up, The Season of Styx Malone, X, and Ibi Zoboi's anthology Black Enough: Stories of Being Young and Black in America that she contributed a short story for, and How It Went Down have received starred reviews from Publishers Weekly. They also chose How It Went Down as a Publishers Weekly Pick.

Kirkus Reviews awarded her debut novel Camo Girl How it Went Down, Marc Aronson and Susan Campbell Bartoletti's 1968: Today's Authors Explore a Year of Rebellion, Revolution, and Change, and The Season of Styx Malone a starred review, calling the latter "Heartening and hopeful, a love letter to black male youth grasping the desires within them, absorbing the worlds around them, striving to be more otherwise than ordinary."

School Library Journal gave starred reviews to Rebellion of Thieves, Jessica Spotswood's anthology A Tyranny of Petticoats: 15 Stories of Belles, Bank Robbers and Other Badass Girls, and The Season of Styx Malone. The Season of Styx Malone was especially praised by critics, also earning a starred review from Shelf Awareness and The Horn Book, and being named one of the best books of 2018 by Kirkus Reviews.

X, co-authored with Ilyasah Shabazz, was one of five novels in 2015 to receive six starred reviews.

Bibliography 
Middle Grade

 Camo Girl (Aladdin, 2011)
 Robyn Hoodlum Series
 Shadows of Sherwood (Bloomsbury USA Children's, 2015)
 Rebellion of Thieves (Bloomsbury USA Children's, 2016)
 Reign of Outlaws (Bloomsbury USA Children's, 2017)
 Infinity Riders (Random House Books for Young Readers, 2016)
 The Season of Styx Malone (Wendy Lamb Books, 2018)

Young Adult

 The Rock and the River Series
 The Rock and the River (Aladdin, 2009)
 Fire in the Streets (Aladdin, 2012)
 37 Things I Love (in No Particular Order) (Henry Holt, 2012)
 How It Went Down (Henry Holt, 2014)
 X, co-authored with Ilyasah Shabazz (Candlewick Press, 2015)
Light It Up (Henry Holt, 2019)

Short Stories

 "For a Moment, Underground" in Things I'll Never Say: Stories About Our Secret Selves, edited by Ann Angel (Candlewick Press, 2016)
 "Pulse of the Panthers" in A Tyranny of Petticoats: 15 Stories of Belles, Bank Robbers and Other Badass Girls, edited by Jessica Spotswood (Candlewick Press, 2016)
 "Makeshift" in I See Reality: Twelve Short Stories About Real Life, edited by Grace Kendall (Farrar, Straus & Giroux, 2016)
 Dear Heartbreak: YA Authors and Teens on the Dark Side of Love. edited by Heather Demetrios (Henry Holt, 2018)
 "Out of the Silence" in Black Enough: Stories of Being Young & Black in America, edited by Ibi Zoboi (Balzer + Bray, 2019)

Non-fiction

 For the Essential Viewpoints Series
 Gun Control (Abdo Publishing Company, 2007)
 The Welfare Debate (Essential Library, 2008)
 Sex Education in Schools (Essential Library, 2009)
 Media Censorship (Essential Library, 2009)
 For the Essential Events Series
 The Salem Witch Trials (Abdo Publishing Company, 2008)
 The Zebulon Pike Expedition (Abdo Publishing Company, 2009)
 For the Essential Lives Series
 Abraham Lincoln (Abdo Publishing Company, 2007)
 Nelson Mandela: A Leader for Freedom (Abdo Publishing Company, 2008)
 Cesar Chavez: Crusader for Labor Rights (Essential Library, 2010)
 Today the World Is Watching You: The Little Rock Nine and the Fight for School Integration, 1957 (Twenty-First Century Books, 2011)
 in 1968: Today’s Authors Explore a Year of Rebellion, Revolution, and Change (Candlewick Press, 2018)

Awards and accolades

References 

Living people
Women writers of young adult literature
21st-century American women writers
21st-century African-American writers
Northwestern University alumni
Vermont College of Fine Arts alumni
Vermont College of Fine Arts faculty
Writers from Fort Wayne, Indiana
Novelists from Michigan
Academics from Michigan
1980 births
American women academics
21st-century African-American women writers
American people of Cameroonian descent
American people of Scottish descent
American people of Dutch descent
 
Writers from Vermont